Tavo Burat (born Gustavo Buratti Zanchi, 22 May 1932 – 8 December 2009) was an Italian Waldensian writer and journalist. Burat spent much of his life defending the Piedmontese language island. Beginning in 1964, Burat was the secretary of an international association that defends languages and cultures threatened with extinction. He specifically focused on defending Piedmontese and Franco-Provençal.

Biography 

Born in Stezzano in 1932, Burat graduated in law with a dissertation titled Right in Graubünden. He taught French at a middle school from 1968 to 1994. 
 

He wrote several history essays, notably about brigandage in northwest Italy and the heresy led by Fra Dolcino. His research about Dolcino involved him not only at a scientific level but also ideally, and Burat considered himself as a neo-dolcinian. In 1974 on the summit of Monte Rubello (1,414 m), where in 1907 left-wing workers of Biella and the Sesia Valley erected a monument on the place of Fra Dolcino last resistance, he laid a new stone memorial. The first monument was symbolically gunned down in 1927 by the Fascists. The 1974 opening ceremony was attended by thousands of people and guided by the Italian Nobel prize Dario Fo.

Tavo Burat also pursued an active political career, at first in the Italian Socialist Party and later in the Verdi, focusing particularly on ecological issues. The Biella section of the voluntary association Legambiente is named Tavo Burat in order to celebrate his environmentalist legacy.

He died in 2009.

Political and cultural career

 City council member in Biella from 1956 to 1994
 Regional manager for PSI from 1975 to 1984
 Representative for the Greens for the revision of the Statute of the Region Piemonte
 National Councillor for the Greens from 2000 to 2009

Works

In Italian 

 1957:  (Milano-Varese, ed. Cisalpino-Goliardica, 1957).
 1974: , dins  (Milano, ed. Cisalpino-Goliardica, 1974).
 1976: , dins U. Bernardi,  (Roma, ed. Coines, 1976).
 1981: , dins  (Milano, ed. Jaca Book, 1981).
 1989:  (Milano, ed. Jaka Book, 1989).
 1997:  (Torino, ed. Regione Piemonte, 1997).
 2000:  (Roma, ed. DeriveApprodi, 2000).
 2002:  (Biella, ed. Leone & Griffa, 2002)
 2004:  (Roma, ed. DeriveApprodi, 2004)
 2006:  (Milano, ed. Lampi di Stampa, 2006)

In Piedmontese 

 1979:  (1979)
 2005:  (ALP, 2005) 
 2008:  (2008)

References

External links 
 Lo sguardo di TAVO BURAT, booklet edited by Club Alpino Italiano depitcting Tavo Burat's life, available in .pdf

1932 births
2009 deaths
Italian Socialist Party politicians
Italian ecologists
Italian male journalists
Italian Waldensians
People from the Province of Bergamo
Piedmontese-language writers
20th-century Italian journalists
20th-century Italian male writers